Antennaria friesiana, or Fries' pussytoes, is an Arctic species of plants in the family Asteraceae.  It is the northern reaches of Asia and North America (Russia, Alaska, Northwest Territories, Yukon, Nunavut, Quebec, Labrador, and Greenland). Many of the populations lack male (staminate) flowers and reproduce asexually.

Subspecies
Classification of this and related species is still a subject of discussion, but The Plant List maintained by Kew Botanic Gardens in London recognizes four subspecies:
 Antennaria friesiana subsp. alaskana (Malte) Hultén – Alaska, Yukon, Northwest Territories
 Antennaria friesiana subsp. beringensis V.V.Petrovsky – Russian Far East
 Antennaria friesiana subsp. friesiana – most of species range
 Antennaria friesiana subsp. neoalaskana (A.E.Porsild) R.J.Bayer & Stebbins – Brooks Range in Alaska; Richardson Mountains + MacKenzie Mountains in Canada

References

External links
Alaska Wildflowers color photos
Circle District Historical Society (Central, Alaska), Pussytoes  Antennaria friesiana (Trautv.) Ekman color photos
The Sunflower Family in Denali National Park and Preserve, Alpine Pussytoes, Fries's Pussytoes Antennaria friesiana 
S.G. Aiken, M.J. Dallwitz, L.L. Consaul, C.L. McJannet, R.L. Boles, G.W. Argus, J.M. Gillett, P.J. Scott, R. Elven, M.C. LeBlanc, L.J. Gillespie, A.K. Brysting, H. Solstad, & J.G. Harris. 2011. Flora of the Canadian Arctic Archipelago.  Antennaria friesiana (Trautv.) E. Ekman. subsp. friesiana

friesiana
Flora of Eastern Canada
Flora of the Russian Far East
Flora of Siberia
Flora of Subarctic America
Plants described in 1879